Garden City USD 457 is a public unified school district headquartered in Garden City, Kansas, United States.  The district includes the communities of Garden City, Friend, Pierceville, Plymell, and nearby rural areas.

Schools
The school district operates the following schools:

High school:
 Garden City High School

Middle school:
 Horace Good Middle School
 Kenneth Henderson Middle School

Intermediate schools:
 Bernadine Sitts Intermediate Center
 Charles O. Stones Intermediate Center

Elementary schools:
 Jennie Barker Elementary School
 Alta Brown Elementary School
 Abe Hubert Elementary School
 Buffalo Jones Elementary School
 Georgia Matthews Elementary School
 Victor Ornelas Elementary School
 Plymell Elementary School
 Edith Schuerman Elementary School
 Gertrude Walker Elementary School
 Florence Wilson Elementary School
 Jennie Wilson Elementary School

Early childhood:
 Garfield Early Childhood Center

Other:
 Garden City Alternative Education
 Garden City Virtual Academy

See also
 Kansas State Department of Education
 Kansas State High School Activities Association
 List of high schools in Kansas
 List of unified school districts in Kansas

References

External links
 

School districts in Kansas
Education in Finney County, Kansas